Augustus Eliott Fuller (7 May 1777 – 5 August 1857) was a British Conservative politician.

Fuller was the son of John Trayton Fuller, of Ashdown House, Sussex, and his wife Anne, daughter of George Augustus Eliott, 1st Baron Heathfield. In 1801, he married Clara Putland-Meyrick (1773–1856), daughter of Owen Putland-Meyrick and Clara née Garth, and they had at least five children: Clara Fuller (died 1831); Owen John Augustus Fuller-Meyrick (1805–1876); Lucy Ann Fuller (1811–1903); Catharine Sarah Fuller (–1858); and Augusta Maria Fuller (–1871).

After unsuccessfully contesting East Sussex at the 1837 general election, Fuller was first elected Conservative MP for the constituency in 1841, and held the seat until 1857 when he was defeated, ranking fourth and last in the poll.

References

External links
 

Conservative Party (UK) MPs for English constituencies
UK MPs 1841–1847
UK MPs 1847–1852
UK MPs 1852–1857
1777 births
1857 deaths